The 1959 Star World Championships were held in Newport Harbor, United States in 1959.

Results

References

Star World Championships
1959 in sailing
Star World Championships in the United States